Katesbridge railway station was a railway station serving the small hamlet of Katesbridge in County Down, Northern Ireland. It was located on the Great Northern Railway (Ireland) which ran from Banbridge to Castlewellan.

History

The station was opened on 14 December 1880.

The station closed on 2 May 1955 under the auspices of the Great Northern Railway Board.  The station served Katesbridge providing direct connections.

References 

Disused railway stations in County Down
Railway stations opened in 1880
Railway stations closed in 1955
1880 establishments in Ireland
1955 disestablishments in Northern Ireland
Railway stations in Northern Ireland opened in the 19th century